Khalil Hilmi (1909 – 17 July 2004) was a Lebanese sports shooter. He competed at the 1948 Summer Olympics and 1952 Summer Olympics.

References

External links
 

1909 births
2004 deaths
Lebanese male sport shooters
Olympic shooters of Lebanon
Shooters at the 1948 Summer Olympics
Shooters at the 1952 Summer Olympics
Sportspeople from Beirut
20th-century Lebanese people